My Beautiful Scream is a concerto for amplified string quartet and orchestra by the American composer Julia Wolfe.  The work was jointly commissioned by Radio France, the Basel Sinfonietta, and the Brooklyn Philharmonic for the Kronos Quartet.  It was first performed on February 6, 2004 at the Festival Presence in Paris by the Orchestre Philharmonique de Radio France and the Kronos Quartet.

Composition
My Beautiful Scream is composed in one continuous movement and has a duration of roughly 25 minutes.

Inspiration
Wolfe composed the piece shortly after the September 11 attacks near Wolfe's home in Manhattan.  She commented on the effects of this experience in the score program note, writing:
Wolfe added:

Instrumentation
The work is scored for an amplified string quartet and an orchestra comprising two flutes, piccolo, two oboes, cor anglais, two clarinets, bass clarinet, two bassoons, contrabassoon, four horns, three trumpets, two trombones, bass trombone, tuba, four percussionists, harp, piano, electric bass guitar, and strings.

Reception
Allan Kozinn of The New York Times praised the composition, writing, "Ms. Wolfe composed My Beautiful Scream as a response to the Sept. 11 attacks, but instead of writing a memorial work or a brooding philosophical piece, she went with pure gut instinct: her piece is an intensely stylized, intricately detailed, elongated slow- motion scream."  He added, "The Kronos and the Brooklyn players rendered the 25-minute work with a patient intensity that brought out its searing, elemental pain, yet kept that pain at a distance, rendering it observable and affecting rather than oppressive."  Janos Gereben of the San Francisco Classical Voice was also impressed by the piece, writing:

Michael Upchurch of The Seattle Times called it "extraordinary" and "elemental in its violence, yet masterfully structured."  Upchurch further remarked, "Scream pits a lightly amplified string quartet against a full orchestra. A gradually intensifying veil of string sound is violated by brutal orchestral intrusions. Doppler-effect distortions in the brass add to the mounting chaos. When the whole edifice collapses, the frenzied quartet finds itself flailing against seething and surging batteries of percussion."

References

Compositions by Julia Wolfe
2003 compositions
Concertos for string quartet
Music about the September 11 attacks
Music commissioned by the Brooklyn Philharmonic
Music commissioned by Radio France